Peter Torrens (28 February 1934 – October 2007) was a British alpine skier. He competed in the men's slalom at the 1956 Winter Olympics.

References

1934 births
2007 deaths
British male alpine skiers
Olympic alpine skiers of Great Britain
Alpine skiers at the 1956 Winter Olympics
Place of birth missing